Shurek may refer to:
 Shurek, Mazandaran
 Shurek, North Khorasan
 Shurek, West Azerbaijan

See also
 Shurak (disambiguation)